Killytoney is a townland lying within the civil parish of Kilcronaghan, County Londonderry, Northern Ireland. It lies in the center of the parish, and is bounded by the townlands of Calmore, Cloughfin, Coolsaragh, Gortamney, Killynumber, and Moyesset. It was apportioned to the Drapers company.

The townland was part of Tobermore electoral ward of the former Magherafelt District Council, however in 1901 and 1926 it was part of Iniscarn district electoral division as part of the Draperstown dispensary (registrar's) district of Magherafelt Rural District. It was also part of the historic barony of Loughinsholin.

Etymology
The first element of the name Killytoney can be either from the Irish words coill (wood) or cill (church), which are indistinguishable in anglicistions due to their pronunciation. Despite this all previous authorities including Irish language scholar John O'Donovan support the derivation from coill. O'Donovan also postulated that the second element is derived from "Tonnaig" (sic), meaning "mound" or "rampart". The Place-Names of Northern Ireland project agrees with this derivation citing that a rath formerly lay within this townland, and that a stockade may have been part of this structure or near it.

History

See also
Kilcronaghan
List of townlands in Tobermore
Tobermore

References

Townlands of County Londonderry
Civil parish of Kilcronaghan